John Isner defeated Alexander Zverev in the final, 6–7(4–7), 6–4, 6–4 to win the men's singles tennis title at the 2018 Miami Open. It was Isner's maiden Masters 1000 title, and he became the first new Miami Open champion in nine years.

Roger Federer was the defending champion, but lost in the second round to Thanasi Kokkinakis.

Federer and Rafael Nadal (despite having withdrawn from the event) were in contention for the ATP No. 1 singles ranking. Nadal regained the top ranking as a result of Federer's second-round loss.

With Novak Djokovic and Federer losing their opening matches and Andy Murray and Nadal missing the tournament due to injuries, this was the first time since the 2004 Paris Masters that none of the Big Four won a match at a Masters 1000 tournament.

Seeds
All seeds receive a bye into the second round.

Draw

Finals

Top half

Section 1

Section 2

Section 3

Section 4

Bottom half

Section 5

Section 6

Section 7

Section 8

Qualifying

Seeds

Qualifiers

Lucky loser

Qualifying draw

First qualifier

Second qualifier

Third qualifier

Fourth qualifier

Fifth qualifier

Sixth qualifier

Seventh qualifier

Eighth qualifier

Ninth qualifier

Tenth qualifier

Eleventh qualifier

Twelfth qualifier

References

External links
Main draw
Qualifying draw

Men's Singles
Men in Florida